Latois is a genus of insects in the hemipteran family Flatidae. The species of this genus are found in Madagascar.

Species
Latois antica (Signoret, 1860)
Latois frontalis Melichar, 1901
Latois major Melichar, 1901
Latois nigrofasciata Swierczewski & Stroinski, 2012
Latois suturalis (Signoret, 1860)

References

Insects of Madagascar
Flatidae
Auchenorrhyncha genera